Nirodia belphegor is a butterfly species in the monotypic genus Nirodia, according to some authors it belongs to the family Lycaenidae and according to others it belongs to the family Riodinidae. It is endemic to Brazil.

References

Riodinini
Fauna of Brazil
Butterflies described in 1851
Endemic fauna of Brazil
Riodinidae of South America
Taxa named by John O. Westwood
Taxonomy articles created by Polbot